Prabhat Kumar is an Indian politician and retired civil servant. An Indian Administrative Service officer of the 1963 batch, he served as the Cabinet Secretary between 1998 and 2000. Upon creation of the State of Jharkhand in November 2000, he was made the first governor.

Biography 
Kumar was born and brought up in Prayagraj, Uttar Pradesh. An Indian Administrative Service (IAS) officer of the 1963 batch and Uttar Pradesh cadre, Kumar served as secretary to the Ministry of Textiles before his appointment as the cabinet secretary.

References

Living people
1940 births
Governors of Jharkhand
Cabinet Secretaries of India
Indian Administrative Service officers